Events from 2013 in Catalonia.

Incumbents

 President of the Generalitat of Catalonia – Artur Mas

Events
 23 January – Declaration on the Sovereignty and Right to Decide of the People of Catalonia approved by the Parliament of Catalonia.
 February – Método 3 affair.
 29 June – Concert for Freedom, held at Camp Nou stadium in Barcelona on June 29, 2013, organized by Òmnium Cultural, to demand the right of Catalonia democratically decide their future.
 11 September – Catalan Way, a 400-kilometre human chain in support of Catalan independence from Spain, take place during the National Day of Catalonia.

References